Redwood Bowl is the main stadium on the campus of Humboldt State University in Arcata, California. It is used for Humboldt State Lumberjacks football games and track and field meets, as well as local high school contests. Construction began in the late 1930s as part of a Work Projects Administration grant.

The first game in Redwood Bowl was played on Sunday, October 8, 1946, with the Stanford University JV defeating Humboldt State, 20–0. Two weeks later, when Stanford's varsity played its first game of the season against UCLA, eight of the "JV" starters against the Lumberjacks were varsity starters. Stanford had been secured for the dedication game in Redwood Bowl to ensure a large crowd.

Complaints from merchants whose Saturday afternoon trade was being drawn away by football games encouraged administrators to begin a campaign geared toward funding lights for Redwood Bowl. In the spring of 1947, lights were purchased from a firm in Iowa for $2,000, with another $1,000 for switches and wiring. Alumnus Bunny Hadley donated the labor to wire the field, and poles were donated by a local lumber operator. Payment for the remainder of the work, including leasing a crane and operator, was through a $4,000 loan secured through Bank of America and paid off out of student fees over the next several years.

The bowl's turf was resurfaced during the summer of 2011, and the track was resurfaced during the summer of 2017. According to HSU Facilities Management, Redwood Bowl is the most heavily used field on campus, employed by recreational sports programs, including intramurals, kinesiology and other department classes, football and track and field team practices and games, commencement, special events and general student use.

The track in Redwood Bowl is 6 lanes on the curves and 9 lanes on the west side straight. The track and field facility inside the bowl includes an all-weather long jump/ triple jump runway and sand pit, with takeoff boards at 8’, 24’, 36’, and 40’, a high jump apron and landing pad, and a pole vault runway and landing pad.

Adjacent to west side of the Redwood Bowl and HSU softball field are the track and field throwing facilities, which feature a 40-meter all-surface javelin runway, a shot put ring, and caged hammer and discus rings.

Redwood Bowl has a max seating capacity of 8,000 people.

References

 William R. Tanner, PhD. A View from the Hill: A History of Humboldt State University. Humboldt State University, Arcata, California: University Graphic Services, 1993.
 Redwood Bowl: Humboldt State University Athletics Website

College football venues
American football venues in California
Buildings and structures in Arcata, California
Humboldt State Lumberjacks football
Soccer venues in California
1946 establishments in California
Sports venues completed in 1946